Monika or A Mother Fights for Her Child is a 1938 German drama film directed by Heinz Helbig and starring Maria Andergast, Iván Petrovich, and Theodor Loos.

Synopsis
An unmarried German engineer and singer have a child together in Sao Paulo. Due to her ambitions for her career she abandons the daughter, leaving her in the care of the father who returns to Germany. Eight years later the mother, now a famous film star, demands custody of the daughter.

Cast

References

Bibliography

External links 
 

1938 films
Films of Nazi Germany
German drama films
1938 drama films
1930s German-language films
Films set in Brazil
Films directed by Heinz Helbig
German black-and-white films
1930s German films